Terellia amberboae is a species of tephritid or fruit flies in the genus Terellia of the family Tephritidae.

Distribution
Uzbekistan, Kazakhstan.

References

Tephritinae
Insects described in 1996
Diptera of Asia